Duke Huan of Qin (died 577 BC) was from 603 to 577 BC the seventeenth ruler of the Zhou Dynasty state of Qin that eventually united China to become the Qin Dynasty.  His ancestral name was Ying (嬴), and Duke Huan was his posthumous title.  Duke Huan succeeded his father Duke Gong of Qin, who died in 604 BC, as ruler of Qin.

In 578 BC, Qin suffered a major defeat at the hand of the State of Jin.  Duke Li of Jin accused Qin of treachery and personally led an alliance of eight states (Jin, Qi, Song, Wey, Zheng, Cao, Zhu, and Teng) to attack Qin.  The two sides fought at Masui (in present-day Jingyang County, Shaanxi).  Qin was resoundingly defeated and two of its generals were captured, although Duke Xuan of Cao, ruler of Jin's ally Cao, was also killed in the battle.

Duke Huan died after a reign of 27 years. He was succeeded by his son, Duke Jing of Qin.

References

Year of birth unknown
Rulers of Qin
7th-century BC Chinese monarchs
6th-century BC Chinese monarchs
577 BC deaths